The 2009 City of London Corporation election took place on 15 March 2009 to elect members of the Court of Common Council in the City of London Corporation, England. These elections take place every four years. 128 candidates contested 100 seats. This yielded only 13 wards where an election was needed to determine who should take the position. As in the previous election, most Council members were elected as independents. The election was the first to ever be contested by the Labour party, who claimed to have decided to run in order to provide voters a choice, and that residents were often overlooked in favour of the business lobby.

All 100 seats were won by independent candidates.

Overall result

References

2009
2009 English local elections